Grevillea punctata is a species of flowering plant in the family Proteaceae and is endemic to a restricted part of the South West region of Western Australia. It is a shrub with oblong to elliptic leaves and scarlet flowers.

Description

TaxonomyGrevillea punctata was first formally described in 1994 by Peter Olde and Neil Marriott in The Grevillea Book from specimens collected by Bill Molyneux, east of Ravensthorpe in 1978. The specific epithet (punctata) means "dotted with small spots".

Distribution and habitat
This grevillea grows in low, open shrubland and is only known from near Jerdacuttup in the Esperance Plains bioregion of south-western Western Australia.

Conservation statusGrevillea punctata'' is listed as  "Priority Three" by the Government of Western Australia Department of Biodiversity, Conservation and Attractions, meaning that it is poorly known and known from only a few locations but is not under imminent threat.

See also
 List of Grevillea species

References

punctata
Proteales of Australia
Eudicots of Western Australia
Endemic flora of Western Australia
Plants described in 1994